Bersama swynnertonii is a species of plant in the Francoaceae family. It is endemic to Zimbabwe.  It is threatened by habitat loss.

References

Francoaceae
Endangered plants
Endemic flora of Zimbabwe
Taxonomy articles created by Polbot